Chinensis is a genus of bush crickets in the subfamily Phaneropterinae containing a single species, Chinensis inermis.

References

External links 

Tettigoniidae
Phaneropterinae
Insects described in 1997
Monotypic Orthoptera genera